The New London and East Lyme Street Railway was a streetcar line that operated in southeastern Connecticut. Its main line ran from New London to Niantic with a later extension to Crescent Beach and a branch to Old Saybrook. The main portion of the line opened on October 5, 1905. The line was extended to Crescent Beach in 1912. In 1913, it was acquired by the Shore Line Electric Railway and extended to Old Lyme.

Route
The line began at the Parade in downtown New London, adjacent to New London Union Station. Cars ran on trackage rights over Connecticut Company local lines along Bank Street to the beginning of NL&EL trackage at Montauk Avenue. The route ran alongside the Boston Post Road (now U.S. Route 1) to Oswegatchie, where a carhouse was located on Niantic River Road. The line ran south on Niantic River Road, crossed Smith Cove (what is now Keeny Cove) on a high trestle, and followed Oswegatchie Road to where it rejoined the Post Road at Keeney's Corner. At Golden Spur (where the Post Road crossed the Niantic River), the company built the Golden Spur Amusement Park to draw weekend ridership. From Flanders Four Corners, the line ran south along Flanders Road (now CT-161) to the New Haven Railroad's Niantic station on Main Street (CT-156) in downtown Niantic.

The 1912 extension to Crescent Beach added  of main track, running along Main Street and Black Point Road to near the Crescent Beach station. Trolley wire was erected over the freight siding to the Connecticut National Guard camp in Niantic, with trolleys providing 'less-than-carload freight' service.

The 1913 branch to Old Lyme followed the Post Road from Flanders Four Corners to Old Lyme, then over the Connecticut River bridge where it met with the Shore Line Electric Railway.

Remains
Since the New London & East Lyme ran primarily along unpaved roads, its trackage was largely removed when the roads were later widened and paved, and no sign of the line remains there. Evidence of the Smith Cove trestle - the only portion of the line not along roads - still exists; the western abutment is in place, as are several intermediate abutments which are visible when water levels are low.

References

External links

Streetcars in Connecticut
Defunct Connecticut railroads
Defunct public transport operators in the United States
Tram, urban railway and trolley companies